The following is a list of episodes of the Topsy and Tim live-action children's series that was shown on the BBC's CBeebies television channel between 2013 and 2015. The programmes were based on the Topsy and Tim books written by Jean Adamson and Gareth Adamson in the 1960s and 1970s. There were three series with a total of seventy-one 15-minute episodes. The list includes the original air dates of each episode. This show currently airs reruns on Universal Kids in the USA. The series was produced by Darrall Macqueen.

Series 1 (2013–2014)
There were 30 episodes in the first series: episodes 1–15 were originally aired on weekday evenings, over a period of three weeks in November 2013; episodes 16–30 were first aired on weekday evenings, over a period of three weeks in February/March 2014.

Series 2 (2014)
There were 31 episodes in the second series: episodes 1–15 were originally aired on weekday evenings, over a period of three weeks in July 2014; episodes 16–30 were first aired on weekday evenings, over a period of three weeks in September/October 2014; a Christmas episode was appended to the series.

Series 3 (2015)
The third and final series was originally aired on Wednesday evenings, one episode per week, in autumn 2015.

References

External links
Topsy and Tim page on Cbeebies website

Topsy and Tim